Axfood AB is a Swedish company that operates in Sweden.   It was formed in May 2000 through a merger between the Swedish grocery store chains Hemköp, D&D Dagligvaror, Spar Sverige, and Spar Inn Snabbgross.

The Group's retail operations are conducted through the Willys, Hemköp, and Axfood Snabbgross chains, comprising 300 group-owned stores in all. In addition, Axfood collaborates with a large number of proprietor-run stores that are tied to Axfood through agreements. These include stores within the Hemköp chain as well as stores run under the Handlar'n, Direkten and Tempo profiles. In all, Axfood collaborates with some 840 proprietor-run stores.

Wholesale business is conducted via Dagab and Axfood Närlivs. Axfood is listed on Nasdaq OMX Stockholm AB's Large Cap list. Axel Johnson AB is the principal owner with 50.1 percent of the shares.

Axfood's private labels consist of Willys, Hemköp, Axfood Snabbgross, Garant, Eldorado (discount food brand), Såklart (body care, laundry and cleaning), Prime patrol (meat), Minstingen (baby products), Falkenberg Seafood (seafood products) and Fixa (kitchen supplies).

Axfood is a member of the European Marketing Distribution, a European purchasing organization for grocery stores, and United Nordic.

History 

1958 The grocer “Spik-Olle” opened the first Hemköp store.

1975 Willys’ predecessor, LL:s Livs started.

1986 Willy Schlees opened his first discount grocery store in Kungsbacka.

2000 Axfood was formed through the combination of Hemköpskedjan, Dagab and D-gruppen.

2008 The private label Garant was launched.

2014 Part owner of Urban Deli.

2016 Acquisition of Eurocash, 51%.

2017 Axfood acquired Mat.se and Middagsfrid.

Market shares and competitors 
Axfood is Sweden’s second largest food retailer and has a 20% market share in Sweden.

The company's main competitors include ICA, Coop Forum, and Lidl.

Sustainability and CSR 
Axfood's sustainability and CSR work is based on its Code of Conduct. The company has numerous sustainability goals. The six central work areas are sustainable products, climate and energy, employees, transports, responsible suppliers, and corporate social responsibility and influence.

Axfood publishes a sustainability report every year. It includes information about the Group’s work towards achieving leadership in sustainable development, including targets, activities, and results.

See also
List of Swedish companies

References

External links 
Axfood - Official site

Companies listed on Nasdaq Stockholm
2000 establishments in Sweden
Retail companies established in 2000
Food retailers of Europe
Food and drink companies based in Stockholm
Retail companies of Sweden